Choi Tae-seop (born 29 December 1962) is a South Korean handball player. He competed in the men's tournament at the 1984 Summer Olympics.

References

1962 births
Living people
South Korean male handball players
Olympic handball players of South Korea
Handball players at the 1984 Summer Olympics
Place of birth missing (living people)
Asian Games medalists in handball
Handball players at the 1982 Asian Games
Handball players at the 1986 Asian Games
Medalists at the 1982 Asian Games
Medalists at the 1986 Asian Games
Asian Games gold medalists for South Korea
Asian Games bronze medalists for South Korea
20th-century South Korean people